Levdeo or LETIN is a Chinese motor vehicle manufacturer headquartered in Shandong, China, that specializes in producing electric vehicles.

History
Levdeo was founded in 2008, and is based in Shandong. It was originally a low-speed electric vehicle company that produced Neighborhood Electric Vehicles.

In January 2019, Levdeo acquired Yema Auto in order to enter the full size electric vehicle market. Levdeo revealed plans to strategically reorganized it, with plans to launch electric vehicles built on existing Yemo gasoline vehicle platforms and upgraded low-speed electric vehicle platforms under the newly launched Letin brand. 

Levdeo launched the i3 under the Letin brand in 2019. The i3 is available in 3 variants, the i3 Base, i3 K-version, and the i3 Comfort. Its dimensions measure 3420 mm × 1500 mm × 1570 mm, and a wheelbase of 2297 mm, with a kerb weight of 830 kg. It takes 9 hours to fully charge. The base price is ¥62,800. 

The i5 was also launched under the Letin brand in 2019. It is available as the i5 Base model and the i5 Comfort model. It measures 4055 mm × 1630 mm × 1510 mm. The wheelbase is 2400 mm and its weight is 1010 kg. Its base price is ¥75,800.

Levdeo's third vehicle was the Letin i9, which was launched in 2020 based on the same platform as the Yema T60 (博骏, Bojun), or essentially a rebadged Yema EC60. Its dimensions are 4360 mm × 1830 mm × 1660 mm, a wheelbase of 2550 mm, and a kerb weight of 1510 kg. It takes 7 hours to charge fully. It costs ¥115,800.

All of these models have since been discontinued in the Chinese market, with their lineup reduced to the newer Mengo and Mengo Pro hatchbacks.

Vehicles

Current models
Levdeo currently has 10 production vehicles.

Letin Mengo (Pro)
Body style: Citycar
Doors: 5
Seats: 4
Battery: 17 kWh
Production: 2020–present
Revealed: 2020

Levdeo i3
Body style: Citycar
Doors: 5
Seats: 4
Battery: 17 kWh
Production: 2019–present
Revealed: 2019

Levdeo i5
Body style: Sedan
Doors: 5
Seats: 4
Battery: 25.55 kWh
Production: 2019–present
Revealed: 2019

Levdeo i9
Body style: SUV
Doors: 5
Seats: 5
Battery: 51.06 kWh
Production: 2020–present
Revealed: 2019

Levdeo D30
Body Style: Hatchback
Doors: 5
Seats: 4
Production: 2014–present
Revealed: 2014

Levdeo D50
Body style: Hatchback
Doors: 5
Seats: 5
Battery:
Production: 2014–present
Revealed: 2014

Levdeo D60/E60
Body Style: Sedan
Doors: 5
Seats: 5
Battery: 220V
Production: 2015–present
Revealed: 2015

Levdeo D70
Body Style: Hatchback
Doors: 5
Seats: 5
Battery:
Production: 2015–present
Revealed: 2015

Levdeo S50
Body Style: SUV
Doors: 5
Seats: 5
Battery:
Production:
Revealed:

Levdeo G10
Body style: Bus
Doors:
Seats: 24
Battery:
Production: 2018–present
Revealed: 2018

Levdeo V60
Body style: hatchback
Doors: 3
Seats: 4
Battery:
Production: 
Revealed:

See also
 Leapmotor
 Min'an Electric
 Sinogold
 Bordrin

References

Electric vehicle manufacturers of China
Car brands
Car manufacturers of China
Chinese brands
Neighborhood electric vehicles